Ukrainians in Mexico are a Ukrainian ethnic minority living in Mexico. The total number of diaspora (according to the census) is between 400 and 1,500 people, of whom 230 are on the consular register.

The largest organization is the Association of Ukrainians of Mexico "Slavutych", headed by Natalia V. Khotyaintseva, there are Ukrainian language departments at the National Autonomous University of Mexico and Monterey, the Ukrainian Dance Ensemble and one newspaper.

Demographics 
1990 - 566 people

2000 - 978 people

2010 - 1500 people

2014 - 4832 people

Notable people 

 Marcos Moshinsky - a prominent Mexican physicist of Ukrainian-Jewish descent, whose research in particle physics was awarded the Prince of Asturias Prize for Technical and Scientific Research in 1988.
 Tosia Malamud (1923-2008) - a Mexican sculptor of Ukrainian descent (a native of Vinnytsia), one of the first women graduates of the Mexican National School of Arts.
 Leon Trotsky - Marxist revolutionary and theorist, Soviet politician, and the founder and first leader of the Red Army.

See also

 Mexico–Ukraine relations
 White Mexicans

References

External links 
 Embassy of Ukraine in the United Mexican States (ukr.)
 La Iglesia Ortodoxa Ucraniana en México sigue dandose a conocer… (sp.)
 Los que llegaron — Rusos y Ucranianos (25/01/2012) (sp.)

People of Ukrainian descent
Ukrainian diaspora
Mexican people of Ukrainian descent
European Mexican